Southeast Africa or Southeastern Africa is an African region that is intermediate between East Africa and Southern Africa. It comprises the countries Botswana, Eswatini, Kenya, Lesotho, Malawi, Mozambique, Namibia, South Africa, Tanzania, Uganda, Zambia and Zimbabwe in the mainland, with the island-nations of Madagascar, Mauritius, Comoros, and Seychelles also included.

History

Prehistory 
East and southern Africa are among the earliest regions where modern humans (Homo sapiens) and their predecessors are believed to have lived. In September 2019, scientists reported the computerized determination, based on 260 CT scans, of a virtual skull shape of the last common human ancestor to modern humans/H. sapiens, representative of the earliest modern humans, and suggested that modern humans arose between 350,000 and 260,000 years ago through a merging of populations in South and East Africa.

Bantu expansion 

Bantu-speakers traversed from Central Africa into Southeast Africa approximately 3,000 years ago.

Swahili coast

Urewe

Madagascar

Kitara and Bunyoro

Lake Plateau states and empires

Buganda

Rwanda

Burundi

Maravi

Modern history 

In the 19th and 20th centuries, David Livingstone and Frederick Courtney Selous visited Southeast Africa. The latter wrote down his experiences in the book Travel and Adventure in South-East Africa.

Demographics and languages 

People include the San people. The Swahili language is spoken, both as an official language and lingua franca, by millions of people.

Culture

Art

Architecture

Clothing

Cuisine

Music

Religion

Film industry

Science and technology

Health

Geography 

Lake Malawi and Limpopo River are located in Southeast Africa.

Climate

Natural Disasters

Wildlife 

Fauna includes the cheetah, leopard, lion, Nile crocodile, hyena, Lichtenstein's hartebeest and white rhinoceros.

See also 
 Mozambique Channel
 Sub-Saharan Africa

Notes

References

External links 
 Africa Southeastern Bantu DNA Ethnicity
 The Smithsonian Is Using a Swahili-Speaking Robot to Break Down Language
 Fires in Southeast Africa and Madagascar (including Mozambique's Gorongosa National Park

 
Geography of East Africa
Geography of Southern Africa
Geography of the Indian Ocean
Regions of Africa